Fakai is a Local Government Area in Kebbi State, Nigeria. Its headquarters are in the town of Mahuta.

It has an area of 2,247 km and a population of 121,212 at the 2006 census.

The postal code of the area is 872.

References

Local Government Areas in Kebbi State